Markovići may refer to the following places:

Bosnia and Herzegovina:
 Markovići (Goražde)
 Markovići (Kiseljak)

Croatia:
 Markovići (Vižinada)